Thirumarperu Manikandeswarar Temple is a Hindu temple dedicated to Shiva in Tirumalpur in Ocheri-Tirumalpur road, Tamil Nadu, India. Constructed in the Dravidian style of architecture, the temple is believed to have been built during the Cholas period in the 9th century. Shiva is worshipped as Manikandeswarar and his consort Parvathi as Karunai Nayagi.

The presiding deity is revered in the 7th century Tamil Saiva canonical work, the Tevaram, written by Tamil saint poets known as the Nayanmars and classified as Paadal Petra Sthalam. A granite wall surrounds the temple, enclosing all its shrines. The temple has a five-tiered Rajagopuram, the gateway tower. 

The temple is open from 6am - 1 pm and 4-8:30 pm on all days. Six daily rituals and three yearly festivals are held at the temple, of which the Maasi Magam, Adipooram, Aani Thirumanjanam, Navarathri uthsavam for Ambal and Garuda seva for Vishnu being some of the prominent festivals celebrated. The temple is maintained and administered by the Hindu Religious and Endowment Board of the Government of Tamil Nadu.

Legend
Vishnu (called Tirumal) is believed to have worshipped Shiva in this temple; hence the name Thirumalpur.
Local tradition says that Tirumalpur was where Vishnu asked Mahabali Chakravarthy to give him land measured by three of Vishnu's steps. As per local legend, when Vishnu touched his discuss on sage Dadisi, the weapon lost its power. As advised by others, Vishnu worshipped Shiva to obtain the Sudharshana discuss. Vishnu started worshipping Shiva at this place daily with thousand flowers. To test his donation, Shiva took away one of the flowers. Vishnu offered his eye in place of the missing flower. Pleased by his devotion, Shiva offer his discuss to Vishnu. Shiva also offered a boon to Vishnu that his devotees in this temple will be blessed with the same grants as they achieve by visiting thousand temples.

History
The place is of both historic and prehistoric importance on account of the paleolithic tools and megalithic potteries found in the region. There are sculptures found with Brahmi script and other material remains. The place is identified in the Kasakkudi plates of Nandivarman II and Aihole inscription of Pulakeshin II that describe the war between Pulekesin and Mahendravarma Pallava. The temple obtained patronage from various ruling empires in the region specifically by the Cholas from Aditya I to Rajaraja I. An inscription by Parthivendra Pallavan from the central shrine indicates that the central shrine and the mandapa around in granite by Paramandadilltan There is a mention of Madurantakan Gandaridattan from the period of Sundara Chola to that of Rajaraja I. An inscription from 988 CE states that Rajaraja himself made a donation of golden flower to the presiding deity.

Architecture
The temple is located in Thirumalpur, which is in the outskirts of kanchipuram. The temple has a four-tiered rajagopuram (tower) and a set of inscriptions from the Chola period of Rajaraja Chola I (985–1014 CE). Appar, the 7th-century saint poet, glorified the deity in Tevaram in one verse.   The temple is also referred to as Hari-chakrapuram. The Nandi, the sacred bull of Shiva, is in standing position in this temple, unlike in other Shiva temples where he is sitting. The temple tree is Vilva. The image of the presiding deity is made of sand from Virundeswara river by Parvathi. The presiding deity is covered by copper pot. Unlike other Shiva temples, ablution is thus not performed on the presiding deity. Chakra Theertha, the temple tank is located outside the main gateway. There is a distinct image of Nandi in standing posture facing the central shrine. There is also an image of Vishnu facing the presiding deity. There is an image of Vallabha Vinayaga with ten arms.

Religious significance and worship practices
The temple finds mention in Tevaram, the 7th century 12 volume Saiva canonical work by Tamil saints, namely Appar, Sundarar and Campantar. It is one of the shrines of the 275 Paadal Petra Sthalams glorified in the Saiva canon. The temple priests perform the puja (rituals) during festivals and on a daily basis. Like other Shiva temples of Tamil Nadu, the priests belong to the Shaiva community, a Brahmin sub-caste. The temple rituals are performed four times a day; Ushathkalam at 6:30 a.m., Kalasanthi at 8:00 a.m., Uchikalam at 12:00 a.m., Sayarakshai at 5:00 p.m., and Ardha Jamam at 8:00 p.m. Each ritual comprises four steps: abhisheka (sacred bath), alangaram (decoration), naivethanam (food offering) and deepa aradanai (waving of lamps) for both Manikandeswarar and Karunai Nayagi. The worship is held amidst music with nagaswaram (pipe instrument) and tavil (percussion instrument), religious instructions in the Vedas (sacred texts) read by priests and prostration by worshipers in front of the temple mast. Mahashivaratri during February - March and Thiruvadihari during December are the major festivals celebrated in the temple. Every year in the month of Maasi (Feb-Mar), on Maga nakshatra (Maga star), the Theerthavari festival is celebrated. The other festivals in the temple are Aadi Pooram, Aaani Thirumanjanam and Marghazi Thiruvathirai. Like Vishnu temples, Garudaseva festival is celebrated in the temple.

Notes

References

.

External links

Padal Petra Stalam
Hindu temples in Kanchipuram district